Linyon Demokratik Seselwa (LDS) is a liberal political coalition which has governed since 2016 in the Seychelles. They have 25 seats in the National Assembly. The coalition was originally made up of the four main opposition parties: the Seychelles National Party (SNP) led by Wavel Ramkalawan, the Seychellois Alliance (LS) led by Patrick Pillay, the Seychelles Party for Social Justice and Democracy led by Alexia Amesbury and the Seychelles United Party led by Robert Ernesta. The Seychellois Alliance left the coalition in February 2018 after the resignation of their leader Patrick Pillay as speaker and member of the National Assembly in January 2018.

Seychelles opposition candidate Wavel Ramkalawan (LDS) won in the 2020 Seychellois general election with 54.9 percent of valid votes cast, upsetting incumbent President Danny Faure.
The opposition won its first presidential poll in over 40 years since Seychelles gained independence from Britain. LDS received also a clear majority (25 out of 35 seats) in the National Assembly.

See also
 Satya Naidu

References

External links
 Official website

Political parties in Seychelles